The Church of Divine Mercy is a church located in Sungai Ara, Penang, Malaysia.
The church was established in July 2005. It is the latest church completed in the Diocese of Penang and also a Christian Community Centre.

History
The Catholic population in the southern Penang Island was increasing fast. In 1989, H. R. Watts, a parishioner of Holy Spirit Cathedral donated a piece of land to the diocese. He wished to build a Christian Community Centre, to promote ecumenism. In 1996, there was a meeting between Bishop Antony Selvanayagam, the Bishop of Penang, and Major and Mrs. Barton (daughter of Mr. Watts) as representatives of the land owner. At this meeting, Mrs. Barton reiterated her father's wish that the land which was donated unconditionally was to be owned and managed by the Roman Catholic Church as a Christian facility.

The then parish priest has also proposed a building plans but things did not go on well. In 2002, Msgr Stephen Liew, a former parish priest, formed a building committee under the advice of bishop. The site plan was submitted in 2004 and building plan in May 2005. In November 2004, the cathedral held a poll and listed a few names to decide an appropriate name for the church. The name Divine Mercy was chosen by most parishioners, and therefore the church was named after Divine Mercy. The Church of Divine Mercy was officially launched and established in July 2005 by former parish priests, Fr. Francis Anthony and Fr. Henry Rajoo.

In total, the church and Christian Community Centre costed RM 8,000,000. Many fundraising drives were held, including a lucky draw, food carnival, a grand dinner and various coffee mornings. On 28 November 2007, the groundbreaking ceremony was held, with Bishop Antony Selvanayagam and former parish priests Fr. Francis Anthony and Fr. Henry Rajoo in attendance. On 15 March 2010, the topping up ceremony was held with a mass.

In July 2010, the church was finally completed. The church was the first in 41 years to be constructed with the previous churches being constructed in 1969 (Holy Spirit Cathedral and Risen Christ Church). Masses started on 22 August 2010 at the completed church building. On 29 September 2010, Bishop Antony Selvanayagam officiate the opening of the church. Also present were the former parish priests Fr. Francis Anthony, Fr. Henry Rajoo and 8 other priests from Penang Island. About 1,500 Catholics gather for the opening ceremony, which was much anticipated by the people. On 29 September 2013, on its 3rd anniversary, the Church of Divine Mercy was officially elevated to parish status with Fr. Martin Arlando being the first parish priest.

In 2015, the church erected a baptismal pool together with a reliquarium. The reliquarium now houses the sacred relics of Catholics saints, Faustina Kowalska and John Paul II. The Church of Divine Mercy is the first church in Malaysia to have obtained the relic of John Paul II.

Current status
Currently, the Church of Divine Mercy caters to about 2,500 Catholics residing in the Bayan Lepas area (also serving the Catholic staff based in the Penang International Airport and also nearby industrial factories as well as their dependents and relatives, both local Penangites as well as migrants from across the country and to a lesser extent, expatriates). The church's capacity currently seats 900 parishioners. The Christian Community Centre has a hall, meeting rooms and classrooms to cater for talks and sessions and also a priests residence. 

The parish priest is Rev Fr. Martin Arlando.

See also
 Roman Catholic Diocese of Penang
 Holy Spirit Cathedral, Penang

References

External links
 Church of Divine Mercy Website
 Penang Diocese Official Website

2005 establishments in Malaysia
Roman Catholic churches completed in 2005
Roman Catholic churches in Penang
Divine Mercy
Southwest Penang Island District